Aedes (Verrallina) lankaensis, or Verrallina (Neomacleaya) lankaensis, is a species complex of zoophilic mosquito belonging to the genus Aedes. It is endemic to Sri Lanka. It is sometimes treated as separate species of the genus Verrallina by some texts.

References

External links
What's New? - Mosquito Taxonomic Inventory

lankaensis
Insects described in 1958